Bashall may refer to:

Bashall Brook, minor river in the English county of Lancashire, England
Bashall Eaves, village in the Ribble Valley district of Lancashire, England
James Bashall CBE, the current General Officer Commanding 1st (UK) Armoured Division